Virginie Lopez is a French para-alpine skier. She represented France in alpine skiing at four Winter Paralympics: in 1980, 1984, 1988 and 1992

She won the bronze medal in the Women's Giant Slalom LW2 event and also in the Women's Slalom LW2 event at the 1988 Winter Paralympics.

See also 
 List of Paralympic medalists in alpine skiing

References 

Living people
Year of birth missing (living people)
Place of birth missing (living people)
Paralympic alpine skiers of France
Alpine skiers at the 1980 Winter Paralympics
Alpine skiers at the 1984 Winter Paralympics
Alpine skiers at the 1988 Winter Paralympics
Alpine skiers at the 1992 Winter Paralympics
Medalists at the 1988 Winter Paralympics
Paralympic bronze medalists for France
Paralympic medalists in alpine skiing
20th-century French women